"Proshai, Livushka" is the 28th episode of the HBO original series The Sopranos and the second of the show's third season. It was written by David Chase and directed by Tim Van Patten, and originally aired on March 4, 2001.

Starring
 James Gandolfini as Tony Soprano
 Lorraine Bracco as Dr. Jennifer Melfi 
 Edie Falco as Carmela Soprano
 Michael Imperioli as Christopher Moltisanti
 Dominic Chianese as Corrado Soprano, Jr.
 Steven Van Zandt as Silvio Dante
 Tony Sirico as Paulie Gualtieri
 Robert Iler as Anthony Soprano, Jr. 
 Jamie-Lynn Sigler as Meadow Soprano
 Drea de Matteo as Adriana La Cerva
 Aida Turturro as Janice Soprano
 John Ventimiglia as Artie Bucco
 Federico Castelluccio as Furio Giunta
 Steven R. Schirripa as Bobby Baccalieri
 Robert Funaro as Eugene Pontecorvo
 Kathrine Narducci as Charmaine Bucco
 Nancy Marchand as Livia Soprano
 Joe Pantoliano as Ralph Cifaretto

Guest starring
 Jerry Adler as Hesh Rabkin
 Peter Hewin as Fat Joe

Also guest starring

Synopsis
At home, Tony greets Meadow and her friend from college, Noah Tannenbaum. Tony and Noah talk briefly about Tony's favorite film The Public Enemy. Alone with him, Tony questions him about his ethnicity and confirms that he is half Jewish and half African-American. Tony tells him that, being black, he must stay away from his daughter. Noah swears at him and storms out. Tony goes to the kitchen; unwrapping some capocollo he sees a box of Uncle Ben's Rice, triggering a panic attack.

Tony has read the newspaper headline: "2nd Firebomb in Sanitation War". He confronts Ralphie Cifaretto, an ambitious and effective member of Richie Aprile's crew, and Albert Barese about the sanitation dispute. He tells them firmly: "No more fires." So, instead, Ralphie has a man beaten up with baseball bats. Separately, Ray Curto meets his handler from the FBI; he is 'cooperating'.

Tony visits his mother Livia in an attempt to set things straight, and tell her what to say if questioned about the stolen airline tickets. She seems to stonewall him. Exasperated, he walks out. That evening, Livia dies from a stroke. Later, Tony tells Dr. Melfi, "I'm glad she's dead." Then he bursts out that he is "a bad son".

Tony's sister Barbara informs him that Janice will not be coming for the funeral. He furiously calls her in Seattle and tells her to be on the next plane; she inveigles him into paying the fare. At the funeral home Janice insists that contrary to her wishes, Livia be given a lavish funeral and, exasperated, Tony agrees. In Livia's house, Janice hammers at the basement wall. At the funeral, still at the graveside, she has a dispute with Livia's caregiver Svetlana about Livia's collection of records. Svetlana says Livia gave them to her; Janice orders her to give them back.

At the post-funeral reception at the Sopranos' house, Janice, against Tony's wishes, corrals everyone into the main room for a ceremony of remembrance. With some reluctance, one or two people speak in memory of Livia. Christopher, stoned on marijuana and cocaine, gives a rambling, unfocused speech. Tony slips outside, where he is confronted by an angry and drunk Artie Bucco, who remembers Livia telling him about Tony's torching of the Vesuvio. Artie goes back inside and seems ready to speak about it but Carmela, who has been drinking, suddenly says, "This is such a crock of shit." She says that Livia was "terribly dysfunctional" and "even from the grave...spread no cheer". Her father, Hugh, then says that Livia "estranged us from our own daughter" and "ruined I don't know how many goddamn Christmases." Carmela then upbraids Tony, Janice and Barbara for ignoring their mother's wishes and having an elaborate funeral. Artie ultimately remains silent.

Afterward, Tony sits in front of the television with a drink and watches the scene from The Public Enemy in which the main character's mother joyfully prepares her home for her son's return, not knowing that he is dead. Tony gets teary.

First appearances
The episode marks the first appearance of:
Ralph Cifaretto: A high-ranking soldier in the former Aprile crew who pushes to be made captain of the said crew.
 Eugene Pontecorvo: A well-liked associate and soon-to-be made man in the Aprile crew.
 Noah Tannenbaum: A half-black, half-Jewish college student and potential boyfriend of Meadow's.
Ronald Zellman: Assemblyman for Newark, New Jersey's Lower 8th Ward.

Deceased
Livia Soprano: dies from a massive stroke in her sleep.

Title reference
 A Romanization of the Russian «Прощай, Ливьюшка»: "Farewell, little Livia." Said in Russian, as a toast in Livia's memory by her caregiver, Svetlana.

Production
 Because of Nancy Marchand's death, David Chase decided that Livia should die as well. Livia's final scene was created using CGI with previous sound clips and scenes featuring Marchand. The cost was approximately $250,000.

 Joe Pantoliano (Ralph Cifaretto), Steve R. Schirripa (Bobby "Bacala" Baccalieri), Robert Funaro (Eugene Pontecorvo), John Ventimiglia (Artie Bucco), and Kathrine Narducci (Charmaine Bucco) are now billed in the opening credits as part of the main cast, but only in episodes in which they appear.
 This is the final episode in which Nancy Marchand is billed in the opening credits. Perhaps to indicate this (and her unusual CGI appearance), her name is preceded by the word 'With'. During the first two seasons, it had been preceded by the word 'And' (which is now the case for Joe Pantoliano).
 The episode was part two of a two-hour season premiere when it originally aired in 2001.
 Vincent Pastore makes a cameo in this episode, when Tony opens a closet door and Pussy is seen in the mirror.

References to other media
 When Tony visits his mother for the final time, he brings her audiobooks of the novels The Horse Whisperer and Omertà.
 Meadow goes upstairs to get her Barenaked Ladies CD, leaving Tony and Noah alone. 
 The book read by the FBI agent in the surveillance van was The Internet for Dummies.
 Various clips from the 1931 gangster film, The Public Enemy starring James Cagney, are featured throughout this episode.
 A.J's doing school work on the poem "Stopping by Woods on a Snowy Evening" by Robert Frost and Meadow helps him by explaining that snow white represents death. AJ thinks that black represented death. On his desk is a black lamp the same type the FBI bugged Tony's basement.  
 The shot of the undertaker from inside a descending elevator references the character Amerigo Bonasera in The Godfather, as does the undertaker's reference to using "all of my power, all of my skill."
 Furio Giunta refers to the reality TV series Survivor, saying that someone should point a gun at the winner and demand 25% of the prize money.

Music 
 The song played over the end credits is "I'm Forever Blowing Bubbles" by Les Paul.  That song is also prominent in The Public Enemy, which Tony watches in this episode.
 "Eyeless" by Slipknot is played in A.J.'s room.
 An organ rendition of Tomaso Albinoni's Adagio in G minor is playing during Livia's wake.
 "Shake It (Like You Just Made Bail)" by Shawn Smith is played while Christopher, Adriana, and Furio take drugs before the wake.
 The song played by Janice on the stereo, in honor of her mother, is "If I Loved You" by Jan Clayton, from the original Broadway cast recording of Carousel.
 The song playing at the start of the episode when a firebomb is detonated in the garbage truck is "I'm Your Captain (Closer to Home)" by Grand Funk Railroad.

Filming locations 
Listed in order of first appearance:

 Paterson, New Jersey
 North Caldwell, New Jersey
 Verona, New Jersey
 Belleville, New Jersey
 Totowa, New Jersey
 Jersey City and Harsimus Cemetery in Jersey City, New Jersey

References

External links
"Proshai, Livushka" at HBO

The Sopranos (season 3) episodes
2001 American television episodes
Television episodes about funerals
Television episodes written by David Chase
Television episodes directed by Tim Van Patten